The Center for the Built Environment (CBE) is a research center at the University of California, Berkeley. CBE's mission is to improve the environmental quality and energy efficiency of buildings by providing timely, unbiased information on building technologies and design techniques. CBE's work is supported by a consortium of building industry leaders, including manufacturers, building owners, contractors, architects, engineers, utilities, and government agencies. The CBE also maintains an online newsletter of the center's latest activities called Centerline.

Overview 

The Center for the Built Environment was founded in 1997 under the National Science Foundation Industry/University Cooperative Research Center (I/UCRC) program. CBE is located in the Building Science Group at the College of Environmental Design at UC Berkeley. CBE is one of the research centers in the Center for Environmental Design Research (CEDR). The Center for Environmental Design Research is an Organized Research Unit at the University of California, Berkeley.

It is one of the largest university laboratories devoted to building research in the United States. Facilities include a controlled environment chamber (designed to resemble a contemporary office, while allowing control over the levels of temperature, humidity, ventilation, and lighting in the space), and a collection of portable equipment for acquiring and analyzing data from field experiments.

Research
CBE's research areas include

 Indoor Environmental Quality (IEQ): CBE’s thermal comfort research program explores ways to advance energy and comfort in buildings, vehicles, clothing and the outdoor environment.
 Building HVAC (Heating, Ventilation, Air Conditioning) Systems: CBE is pursuing multiple projects to advance emerging HVAC systems and control strategies. Major development includes developing guidelines, tools, and resources for radiant system designers, creating an ASHRAE Design Guide on underfloor air distribution systems, and analyzing potential advantages and limitations of advanced integrated systems.
 Facade Systems: CBE continues several building envelope efforts. Major development includes developing an adaptive comfort model for thermal comfort in naturally ventilated buildings, investigating multiple topics related to mixed-mode buildings, and analyzing the impact of window views, and their related impacts on thermal comfort, emotional states and cognitive performance.
 Human Interactions: CBE’ multiple projects focus on perceptions, behaviors and relationship occupants have with the environments in which they interact, and provides tools to examine occupants’ relationship with their spaces. Major development includes developing a web-based occupant indoor environmental quality survey tool to assess the performance and success of the design  and analyzing the occupant satisfaction in green and LEED-Certified buildings.
 Sustainability, Whole Building Energy, and Other Topics.

CBE provides information about its research areas and publications on its website. More than 440 works by researchers affiliated with CBE are available to the public on the center's eScholarship page.

CBE's research program is guided by its Research Team and Advisory Board. The CBE Advisory Board includes manufacturers, building owners, facility managers, contractors, architects, engineers, government agencies and professional associations. The research team includes people from across UC Berkeley's campus, with both staff scientists and graduate students, as well as scientists from Lawrence Berkeley National Lab and visiting experts from industry and other research institutions.

Directors
The Center for the Built Environment is directed by Professor Edward Arens. Arens is Professor Emeritus of Architecture at the University of California, Berkeley. In addition to serving as directory, Arens is technical and standards committees of American Society of Heating, refrigerating, and Air-Conditioning Engineers (ASHRAE), and co-founded the Society of Building Science Educators (SBSE). He has been principal investigator for a large number of state, federal, and industry grants addressing building energy performance, indoor environmental quality criteria, field monitoring procedures, and architectural aerodynamics. His research focuses on commercial/institutional buildings. Professor Arens started UC's Building Science Laboratory in 1980 after heading the Architectural Research Section at the National Bureau of Standards.  

Gail S. Brager is CBE’s Associated Director and has been a Professor in the College of Environmental Design since 1984. Her primary research efforts are in mixed-mode buildings, which combine natural and mechanical ventilation. Brager is the Director of the Center for Environmental Design Research and as the Associated Dean of the Graduate Division at University of California, Berkeley. Professor Brager was the founding Chair of the Research Committee of the US Green Building Council. She won the Ralph Nevins award in 1989. She is also an ASHRAE Fellow and Past-President of the Golden Gate ASHRAE Chapter.

Industry Consortium  
The CBE has multiple partners from industry and government organizations, which contribute to research activity by keeping the Centrer focused on current issues/research. As a CBE member or as a sponsor, partners have opportunities that include: influencing the direction of the research, access to facilities, access tools and trained personnel, access to research studies results, influence cost-effectiveness, association with diverse industries, staff training and recruiting opportunities, corporate responsibility and community relations.

Member agreements rank on different levels: 

Industry Sponsoring Membership
A/E/C (Architectural, Engineers, Construction) Membership
Small Business Membership
Team Membership

The CBE maintains a list of current industry partners.

References

External links
Center for the Built Environment - The homepage for the organization
CBE Thermal Comfort Tool- free web tool for ASHRAE 55
CED Industry Partners - A comprehensive list of industry partners
Lawrence Berkeley National Lab - The homepage of Lawrence Berkeley National Lab

University of California, Berkeley